"Nights with You" is a song by Danish singer and songwriter MØ. It was released on 21 April 2017 via Sony Music for her second studio album, Forever Neverland, but was only included on the Japanese release of the album.

Background
The song premiered on MistaJam's BBC Radio 1 show.

Music video
The music video was released on 22 May 2017 and filmed in Plovdiv and Buzludzha, Bulgaria. "'Nights With You' was written for my best and oldest friend, and the song is a celebration of our friendship and of my love for her," says MØ. "I obviously wanted the video to be about friendship but I wanted it to communicate this in a wide and universal way. I wanted it to be a reflection on unity in both bright times and in dark — about standing together strong and shining the light across borders and generations."

Track listing

Personnel
Adapted from Tidal.

 MØ – composer, vocalist
 Benny Blanco, Cashmere Cat, Sophie – composer, producer, keyboard, programmer
 Ryan Tedder – composer
 Serban Ghenea – mixing engineer
 John Davies – mastering engineer
 John Hanes, David Schwerkolt – engineer
 Andrew Luftman, Seif Hussain, Sarah Shelton – coordinator

Charts

Certifications

Release history

References

2017 singles
2017 songs
MØ songs
Songs written by Benny Blanco
Songs written by Ryan Tedder
Songs written by Cashmere Cat
Songs written by MØ
Songs written by Sophie (musician)
Song recordings produced by Benny Blanco
Song recordings produced by Cashmere Cat
Song recordings produced by Sophie (musician)